Charles Philip "Bubs" Mosley (March 24, 1888 – August 25, 1968) was an American football, basketball, and baseball player and coach.  He served as the head football coach at Baylor University from 1914 to 1919 and at Wichita Falls Junior College—now Midwestern State University—from 1924 to 1925, compiling a career college football record of 34–26–6.  Mosley was also the head basketball coach at Baylor from 1914 to 1920, tallying a mark of 28–65, and the school's head baseball coach from 1914 to 1919, amassing a record of 47–60.

Coaching career
As the head football coach at Baylor, Mosley compiled a 30–18–4 (.615) record in six seasons. His 1916 team ranked as one of the best in school history.  The Bears finished the season 9–1, with wins over Texas, and Oklahoma A&M. The team's only loss that season was by three points to Texas A&M. The Bears had outscored opponents 315–27 during the season winning seven of the games by 15 points or more.

Head coaching record

Football

References

1888 births
1968 deaths
American men's basketball players
Basketball coaches from Texas
Basketball players from Texas
Baylor Bears athletic directors
Baylor Bears baseball coaches
Baylor Bears baseball players
Baylor Bears men's basketball coaches
Baylor Bears men's basketball players
Baylor Bears football coaches
Baylor Bears football players
Midwestern State Mustangs football coaches
People from Sulphur Springs, Texas